The Hollywood Post Alliance Award for Outstanding Sound in a Feature Film is an annual award, given by the Hollywood Post Alliance, or HPA, to post production workers in the film and television industry, in this case sound . It was first awarded in 2006, and has been presented every year since. From 2006 to 2009, the category was titled Hollywood Post Alliance Award for Outstanding Audio Post - Feature Film.

Winners and nominees
 †† – indicates the winner of both the Academy Award for Best Sound Editing and Academy Award for Best Sound Mixing.
 ‡‡ – indicates nominations for both the Academy Award for Best Sound Editing and Academy Award for Best Sound Mixing.
 †‡ – indicates a winner of the Academy Award for Best Sound Editing and a nominee for the Academy Award for Best Sound Mixing
 ‡ – indicates a nomination for the Academy Award for Best Sound Editing

2000s
Outstanding Audio Post - Feature Film

2010s
Outstanding Sound - Feature Film

References

American film awards
Film sound awards